Mitcham Cemetery on Old Belair Road, Mitcham, South Australia is made up of three separate cemeteries: Mitcham General Cemetery, Mitcham Anglican Cemetery and St Joseph's Cemetery. The cemeteries are administered by the City of Mitcham, the Anglican Diocese of Adelaide and the Sisters of St. Joseph.

Mitcham General Cemetery was 'established in 1854 for non conformist or "dissenting" Protestant denominations to  the neighbouring Church of England Cemetery.' Despite being extended on a number of occasions, new leases for burial plots are not being let, however existing leases can still be used for new burials. The first burial occurred on 3 November 1853.

Mitcham Anglican Cemetery was established in 1854, up to 1953 it was controlled and maintained by members of the local parish of St Michael, and now by the Diocese of Adelaide.

Interments
 Sir Harry Alderman, (1895–1962) lawyer
 Ella Cleggett, (1884–1960) schoolteacher and welfare worker
 Laura Mary Louisa Corbin, (1841–1906) crèche founder
 George Davidson (1855–1936), Presbyterian minister
 Edwin Theyer Dean, (1884–1970) army officer
 George Henry Dean, (1859–1953) soldier, stock and station agent and grazier
 Sir David John Gordon, (1865–1946) journalist and politician
 Anne Syrett Green, (1858–1936) welfare worker and evangelist
 William Hague, (1864–1924) storekeeper and politician
 Hilda Mary Hanton, (1884–1954) hospital matron
 Kate Hill, (1859–1933) nurse
 Charles Henry Standish Hope, (1861–1942) medical practitioner
 Laura Margaret Hope, (1868–1952) medical practitioner
 Walter Howchin, (1845–1937) geologist and clergyman
 Sidney Kidman, (1857–1935) pastoralist who owned or co-owned large areas of land in Australia
 Ernest Eugene Kramer, (1889–1958) missionary
 Lydia Longmore, (1874–1967) infant-teacher
 Sir William Mitchell, (1861–1962) scholar, educationist and administrator
 John Pearce, (1840–1910) teamster, farmer, carrier and administrator 
 Arthur William Piper, (1865–1936) judge
 Thomas Piper, (1835–1928) clergyman
 Frederick William Preece, (1857–1928) bookseller and publisher
 John Lloyd Preece, (1895–1969) bookseller and publisher
 John Lloyd Price, (1882–1941) union official, agent-general and politician
 Thomas (Tom) Price, (1852–1909) premier
 Robert Henry Pulleine, (1869–1935) physician and naturalist
 Herbert Clarence Richards, (1876–1949) businessman and motor-body manufacturer
 Tobias John Martin Richards, (1850–1939) manufacturer
 John Henry Sexton, (1863–1954) Baptist clergyman
 David Shearer, (1850–1936) agricultural machinery manufacturer and inventor
 John Shearer, (1845–1932) agricultural machinery manufacturer and inventor
 Alfred Depledge Sykes, (1871–1940) clergyman
 James Gilbert Woolcock, (1874–1957) mining engineer and metallurgist

Anglican Cemetery
 Robert Barr Smith, (1824–1915) businessman and philanthropist
 Tom Elder Barr Smith, (1863–1941) pastoralist and financier
 Frederick William Coneybeer, (1859–1950) trade unionist and politician
 Daniel Michael Paul Cudmore, (1811–1891) pastoralist in the early days of South Australia
 James Davidson, (1885–1945) ecologist
 Sir Thomas Elder, (1818–1897) Scottish-Australian public figure
 Felix Gordon Giles, (1885—1950) engineer
 Walter Gooch, (1842–1918) merchant and conservationist
 Laurence Hotham Howie, (1876–1963) artist and teacher
 George Richards Laffer, (1866–1933) fruit-grower and politician
 Luther Robert Scammell
 Sir William Mitchell, (1861–1962) University of Adelaide Professor, Vice Chancellor and Chancellor, 1942–1948
 Catherine Maria Thornber
 Alexander Tolmer, (1815–1890) police officer
 Peter Waite
 Stanley Holm Watson, (1887–1985) railway engineer and soldier
 Lawrence Allen Wells, (1860–1938) explorer

References

Cemeteries in South Australia
Anglican cemeteries in Australia
1854 establishments in Australia
Roman Catholic cemeteries in Australia